The Gilhoolie is a kitchen appliance that opens jars and bottles.  It was invented by Dr. Charles W. Fuller, a retired dentist from Yonkers, New York.  

The Gilhoolie debuted in 1953. Fuller applied for a United States patent on the Gilhoolie, identified as a "cam operated sliding jaw closure remover", in 1952, and the patent was granted in 1954.  Although Fuller held more than a dozen patents in the fields of dentistry and golf, the Gilhoolie patent was his only patent for a kitchen device.

For several years, the Gilhoolie was sold through mail order by the Riswell Company of Cos Cob, Greenwich, Connecticut.

See also
Jar opener

References

External links
 1954 patent

American inventions